Alton Regional Multimodal Transportation Center, also known as Alton station, is a station in Alton, Illinois, that is served by Amtrak's Lincoln Service and the Texas Eagle. This was also a stop for the Ann Rutledge until April 2007. It is one of three Amtrak stations in the St. Louis metropolitan area; the other two are the Gateway Multimodal Transportation Center located in downtown St. Louis, and the Amtrak station in Kirkwood, Missouri.

History
The former Alton Railroad station, later used by the Gulf, Mobile and Ohio Railroad was built of brick. This station was located on College Avenue, south of the current station location. The 1928-built station was demolished after the current transportation center was opened.

Part of the funding awarded to the Illinois Department of Transportation (IDOT) included $7.4 million for the construction of a new station in Alton, which is one of the busiest Amtrak stops in the state. In December 2011, the city received an additional $13.85 million for the new station through the U.S. Department of Transportation's Transportation Investments Generating Economic Recovery (TIGER) program.

The Alton Regional Multimodal Transportation Center, which opened September 13, 2017, accommodates intercity passenger rail, local and regional buses, taxis, and cyclists. IDOT architects designed the station, and the city then assumed ownership and maintains the property.

Transportation
Alton Station serves as a multimodal transfer point for Amtrak and Madison County Transit.

Amtrak
The station is currently served by Amtrak's Lincoln Service and the Texas Eagle, with an average of 10 trains daily.

Bus transportation 
The station is connected to Madison County Transit bus routes 7, 8, and 10.

References

External links

Alton Amtrak station information

Amtrak Stations Database

Amtrak stations in Illinois
Railway stations in the United States opened in 2017
Transportation buildings and structures in Madison County, Illinois